Brusqeulia baeza is a species of moth of the family Tortricidae. It is found in Ecuador.

The wingspan is about 15 mm. The ground colour of the forewings is cream with an indistinct yellow-brown admixture in the basal half of the wing and darker, yellower strigulae (fine streaks) in the terminal area. The markings are black. The hindwings are brownish grey.

Etymology
The specific name refers to the type locality, Baeza, Ecuador.

References

Moths described in 2011
Brusqeulia
Moths of South America
Taxa named by Józef Razowski